Eduardo Baltar (born 2 October 1956) is a Filipino Olympic boxer. He represented his country in the light-flyweight division at the 1976 Summer Olympics. He lost his first match against Armando Guevara.

1976 Olympic results
Below is the record of Eduardo Baltar, a Filipino light flyweight boxer who competed at the 1976 Montreal Olympics:

 Round of 32: lost to Armando Guevara (Venezuela) by decision, 0-5

References

External links
 

1956 births
Living people
Filipino male boxers
Olympic boxers of the Philippines
Boxers at the 1976 Summer Olympics
Light-flyweight boxers